William or Bill Schneider may refer to:

William Schneider (politician) (born 1959), former attorney general of Maine
William Schneider Jr. (born 1941), chairman of the American Defense Science Board
William C. Schneider (1923–1999), American aerospace engineer
Creed Bratton (William Charles Schneider, born 1943), American actor
William G. Schneider (1915–2013), Canadian chemist and research administrator
William H. Schneider (born 1934), United States Army general
Bill Schneider (journalist) (born 1944), political commentator for CNN
Bill Schneider (musician), bassist, guitar tech, and tour crew manager
Buzz Schneider (born 1954), American ice hockey player, 1980 Olympic gold medalist